The 2019 ASUN men's soccer tournament, the 41st edition of the ASUN Men's Soccer Tournament, determined the ASUN Conference's automatic berth for the 2019 NCAA Division I men's soccer tournament. The tournament began on November 8 and concluded on November 16.

NJIT, the ASUN regular season champion, won the tournament for the first and only time in program history; the Highlanders would join the America East Conference on July 1, 2020. They defeated Florida Gulf Coast in the finals, 2–1. NJIT earned their first-ever berth to the NCAA Tournament, where they were defeated in the first round by Providence.

Seeds

Bracket

Results

First round

Semifinals

Final

Statistics

Top goalscorers 
2 Goals
  Sebastian Chalbaud – Stetson
  Alejandro Rabell – NJIT
  Regsan Watkins – NJIT

1 Goal

  Brayden Borutskie – Liberty
  Zane Bubb – North Florida
  Noah Bushey – FGCU
  Chris Degance – Stetson
  Miguel DeLeon, Jr. – North Florida
  O’Vonte Mullings – FGCU
  Ivan Rosales – FGCU
  Lewis Scattergood – Stetson
  Tyler Welch – Liberty
  Torian Went – North Florida
  Rene White – NJIT

All Tournament Team

References

External links 
 2019 ASUN Men's Soccer Championship
 2019 ASUN Men's Soccer Tournament Bracket

ASUN Men's Soccer Tournament
ASUN Men's Soccer Tournament
ASUN Men's Soccer Tournament
ASUN Men's Soccer Tournament
ASUN Men's Soccer Tournament